Falklandia is a monotypic genus of  araneomorph spiders in the family Orsolobidae containing the single species, Falklandia rumbolli. It was first described by Raymond Robert Forster & Norman I. Platnick in 1985, and is only found on the Falkland Islands.

See also
 List of Orsolobidae species

References

Monotypic Araneomorphae genera
Orsolobidae
Spiders of South America
Taxa named by Raymond Robert Forster